Rosa de Eguílaz y Renart (born 11 October 1864; date of death unknown) was a Spanish playwright and journalist. She was the daughter of playwright Luis de Eguílaz.

As an orphan only eleven years old, Rosa de Eguílaz y Renart presented Retrato de su señor padre and Una cantora del siglo XV (in oil) at the Exhibition of 1876. She belonged to the Women's Section of the Ibero-American Union and contributed to magazines such as El Mundo de los Niños and La Edad Feliz. The latter was an Iberian court drama about the problems caused by a woman using a male pseudonym to find success as a writer.

References

1864 births
Year of death unknown
19th-century Spanish dramatists and playwrights
Spanish women journalists
Writers from Madrid
19th-century Spanish women writers
Spanish women dramatists and playwrights